Cittanova Interpiana Calcio is an Italian association football club located in Cittanova, Calabria. It in the season 2012–13 plays in Eccellenza.

History 
The club was born in 2010 and merged with A.S. Rosarno (based in Rosarno, Calabria) in order to play immediately in Serie D.

In April, 2011, the club's assets were seized by authorities in a raid of suspected mafia assets. In the season 2011–12 it was relegated to Eccellenza.

Colors and badge 
The team's colors are green and white.

References

External links
Official homepage

Football clubs in Calabria
Association football clubs established in 2010
2010 establishments in Italy